Dan Currie (born March 15, 1968) is a Canadian retired professional ice hockey left winger.

Biography
Currie was born in Burlington, Ontario. As a youth, Currie played in the 1981 Quebec International Pee-Wee Hockey Tournament with a minor ice hockey team from Burlington. 
He played junior hockey for the Sault Ste. Marie Greyhounds of the Ontario Hockey League and played for the Canada national junior hockey team that won the gold medal at the 1988 World Junior Ice Hockey Championships.

He was drafted by the Edmonton Oilers in the fourth round of the 1986 NHL Entry Draft and joined their American Hockey League minor league affiliate Cape Breton Oilers at the end of the 1987–88 season.  He spent the next five seasons in the Oilers' organization, but only played in 17 games for the NHL team.  Currie signed with the Los Angeles Kings for the 1993-94 season, but only played in five games for the Kings that season.  He spent most of that year and the next four seasons in the International Hockey League.

Currie played in the German Deutsche Eishockey Liga for the 1998–99 season, followed by two seasons playing for Bakersfield in the West Coast Hockey League.  He returned to Europe for one season in the Italian Serie A and one season in the British National League.

Career statistics

References

External links

1968 births
Living people
Bakersfield Condors (1998–2015) players
Bolzano HC players
Canadian expatriate sportspeople in England
Canadian ice hockey left wingers
Cape Breton Oilers players
Chicago Wolves (IHL) players
Edmonton Oilers draft picks
Edmonton Oilers players
Fort Wayne Komets players
Hannover Scorpions players
HC Merano players
Hull Thunder players
Los Angeles Kings players
Minnesota Moose players
Nova Scotia Oilers players
Phoenix Roadrunners (IHL) players
Sault Ste. Marie Greyhounds players
Ice hockey people from Ontario
Sportspeople from Burlington, Ontario
Canadian expatriate ice hockey players in Italy
Canadian expatriate ice hockey players in Germany